The Spiral is a type or class of sailing dinghy.
It is similar to a Laser (dinghy), but smaller and easier to manoeuvre on land and in the water, and suited to a skipper of smaller body weight and more fun to sail in heavier conditions than is a Laser due to its greatly improved wider interior for the sailor.

External links
 Spiral Class Association of Australia
 http://www.ok.yachting.org.au/db/cl_display.asp?ID=2765&Action=Data
 http://www.nsw.yachting.org.au/default.asp?Page=6967&MenuID=Youth%2F1060%2F3659%2CYouth_Class_Profiles%2F10423%2F4706

Dinghies